Pantani: The Accidental Death of a Cyclist is a 2014 feature-length documentary film directed by James Erskine. It is about the life and death of road racing cyclist Marco Pantani.

Pantani: The Accidental Death of a Cyclist was averagely received, mostly because of the too much sympathetic representation with regards to the accusation of doping. The Guardian gave the documentary three stars out of five, praising the "thrilling footage' but criticising how "it can't close the book on the doping allegations." Similarly, The Huffington Post stated that the director tended to eschew exploring Pantani's dark side in favor of focusing on his achievements. Time Out gave the documentary 3 stars out of five, describing Pantani's depiction much softer than most media accounts of Lance Armstrong.

On review aggregator Rotten Tomatoes, the film holds an approval rating of 84% based on 19 reviews, with an average rating of 6.29/10.

References

External links 

2014 films
2014 documentary films
2010s Italian-language films
Documentary films about cycling
2010s English-language films
British sports documentary films
2010s British films